The Jodhpur–Bathinda line connects , in the Indian state of Rajasthan to  in the Punjab, via Dabwali Railway in Haryana. During the British Raj, Bathinda was on the Delhi–Karachi line and after independence and partition of India in 1947, it is on the Delhi–Fazilka line. This line operates under the jurisdiction of North Western Railway.

History
A -wide metre-gauge line from Marwar Junction to Pali was built by the Rajputana Railway in 1882. It was extended to Luni in 1884 and Jodhpur in 1885. It formed the first Jodhpur Railway. It later became part of Jodhpur–Bikaner Railway.

In 1889, the Bikaner Princely State and Jodhpur Princely State started constructing the Jodhpur–Bikaner Railway within the Rajputana Agency. In 1891 the metre gauge Jodhpur – Merta Road sector was opened on 8 April, the Merta Road–Nagaur sector on 16 October, and the Nagaur–Bikaner sector on 9 December. In 1901–02, the metre-gauge line was extended to Bathinda. The Jodhpur–Bikaner line was extended to Bathinda in 1901–02 to connect it with the metre-gauge section of the Bombay, Baroda and Central India Railway and the metre gauge of North Western Railway Delhi–Fazilka line via Hanumangarh.

Sometime around or prior to 1991, the construction work for the conversion from meter gauge to -wide  broad gauge of the Jodhpur–Bikaner line, along with the link to Phulera, were started, and it was already functioning as broad gauge Jodhpur–Merta City–Bikaner–Bathinda line by 2008.

Passenger movement
 is the only railway station on this line which is amongst the top hundred booking stations of Indian Railway.

Workshops
The former metre-gauge workshop at Jodhpur now performs periodic overhauling of broad-gauge passenger coaches. The former metre-gauge workshop at Bikaner (Lalgarh) workshop carries out periodic overhauling of broad-gauge coaches and wagons.

References

External links
Trains at Jodhpur
Trains at Bikaner
Trains at Suratgarh
Trains at Bathinda

5 ft 6 in gauge railways in India
Rail transport in Rajasthan
Rail transport in Haryana
Rail transport in Punjab, India
Jodhpur railway division

Bathinda district